Manoir Industries is a global metal processing company mainly focusing on high tech casting and forging components in petrochemical, nuclear, oil and gas, civil engineering, energy, defense, heavy weight trucks, tractors and aerospace markets. Manoir Industries employs 1,400 workers in 7 manufacturing locations in France, the United Kingdom, India and China.

History 

Manoir Industries was created in 1917 in the commune of Pîtres in northwestern France. It was built between the towns of Pîtres and Le Manoir, from the latter of which comes its trade name. Manoir has become the Manoir Industries group by successive acquisitions. From 1917 to 1995, Manoir Industries acquired forging plants including Bouzonville, and Manoir Custines then Saint-Brieuc’s foundry dedicated to wear parts. In 1994, Manoir expanded to a worldwide presence with a joint-venture in China becoming Yantai Manoir in 2006. In 2008 Hi-Tech Fabrication, a welding company located in the United Kingdom, joined the group, and in 2010 Kartik Steels also became part of Manoir. Kartik, specializing in tube supports for petrochemical furnaces, is a foundry in Chennai, India.

On February 28, 2013, the Yantai Taihai Group, a Manoir Industries partner for 15 years and a leading private company in China for nuclear casting and forging components, became Manoir's newest shareholder and committed to a long-term partnership with Manoir by speeding-up investments and building-up its international position.

Markets 

 Aerospace: forged components certified by helicopter companies and components for landing gear.
 Civil engineering: forged components for excavators, loaders and off-highway trucks.
 Mining components: forged components for dump trucks, roof support and fly bars.
 Nuclear: cast components as elbows, pump and valve bodies, tubes, pipes composed of loops for the primary circuit and forging parts such as tubes, valve bodies, manway pads, heat exchanger, feed water nozzle and other various components. 
 Oil and Gas: forged and cast subsea and offshore components for conventional and unconventional (shale) oil and gas extraction.
 Petrochemical: manufacturing cast and centrifuged tubes  to equip cracking (ethylene) and reforming (ammonia, methanol, hydrogen) furnaces.
 Steel industry: radiants and tubes.
 Transport: forged components for professional heavy trucks and the railway market.

Manufacturing process 
Manoir Industries technologies and know-how cover steel casting (static and centrifugal casting), forging (close-die, extrusion, welding), and provide ‘ready-to-assemble’ gear grinding and cutting, machined, surface treated, painted, shotblasted, coated parts to its customers.

In forging or casting processes, small- and mid-size batches of various morphologies are manufactured in a large range of alloys and are undergo controls meeting customers quality requirements:

 Dye penetrant inspection
 Magnetic particle inspection
 Ultrasonic examination
 Dimensional controls...

The Petrochemical and Nuclear BU with the Pîtres, Burton-on-Trent, Yantai and Chennai plants offer high technology components to withstand high temperatures. The Excellence center, based in Pîtres and historical innovator of high temperature alloys, guarantees the process and quality for Manoir’s Petrochemical plants.
The Manoir Forging Solutions with the Bouzonville forging plant and Manoir Engrenages provide all the closed-die, extrusion, gear grinding and cutting, machining and control processes for parts operating under severe conditions (nuclear, defense, oil&gas, mine, civil engineering, transport (heavy weight trucks and railways components), tractors and aerospace…).

Innovation and customers service 
Manoir Industries develop high-temperature alloys which increase the life cycle of components and improve the existing solutions. Manoir AlloyServices enhance the performance of petrochemical facilities
Bouzonville’designer of forged components works with clients, from the design stage to the delivery of ready-to-assemble sets.

References

External links 
 Un fournisseur d'Areva racheté par un groupe chinois) 

1917 establishments in France